XHMG-FM is a radio station in Monterrey, Nuevo León. Broadcasting on 102.9 FM, XHMG is owned by Grupo Radio Alegría and carries a pop format known as Digital 102-9.

History
Fernando Gracia López obtained the concession for XHMG, then broadcasting at 100.5 FM, on August 19, 1969. The station was sold in 1985 and had moved to 102.9 by 1989.

References

Radio stations in Monterrey